Slovakia competed at the 2015 European Games, in Baku, Azerbaijan from 12 to 28 June 2015.

Slovakia won 1 gold, 3 silver and 3 bronze medals in Baku. Originally, Slovakia won 2 gold medals, but after Azerbaijan's Dzmitry Marshin was suspended for four years after he failed a drug test, Slovakia lost athletics gold medal because this subsequent doping disqualification led to changes in final standings. Austria received an additional point and overhauled Slovakia.

Medalists

| width=78% align=left valign=top |

|width=22% align=left valign=top |

Archery

Men

Women

Mixed

Athletics

Men's (Tomáš Benko, Andrej Bician, Jakub Bottlík, Matúš Bubeník, Tomáš Čelko, Denis Danáč, Slaven Dizdarević, Martin Koch, Martin Kučera, Marcel Lomnický, Jakub Matúš, Matúš Olej, Dušan Páleník, Jozef Pelikán, Lukáš Privalinec, Jozef Repčík, Marek Šefránek, Roman Turčáni, Jozef Urban, Tomáš Veszelka, Juraj Vitko, Ján Volko, Adam Závacký, Ján Zmoray, Pavol Ženčár, Patrik Žeňúch
Reserve: (Peter Ďurec, Alexander Jablokov, Leonard Lendvorský, Róbert Lӧbb, Lukáš Beer, Tomáš Krajňak, Martin Benák, Libor Charfreitag)

Women's (Katarína Beľová, Katarína Berešová, Alexandra Bezeková, Paula Habovštiaková, Andrea Holleyová, Martina Hrašnová, Anna Mária Hrvolová, Zuzana Karaffová, Lucia Klocová, Lenka Kršáková, Veronika Ľašová, Ľubomíra Maníková, Lucia Mokrášová, Michaela Pešková, Katarína Pokorná, Iveta Putalová, Lucia Slaničková, Patrícia Slošárová, Sylvia Šalgovičová, Alexandra Štuková, Ivona Tomanová, Dana Velďáková, Jana Velďáková, Monika Weigertová)
Reserve: (Júlia Kočárová, Nikola Lomnická, Klaudia Kálnayová, Ivana Krasňanová, Miroslava Vargová)

Badminton

Men

Women

3x3 Basketball

Women's tournament

Team

 Alexandra Pribulová
  Alexandra Riecka
 Zuzana Mračnová
 Dominika Baburová

Group Play

Eighth Finals

Boxing

Men

Canoe sprint

Men

Women

Cycling

Spain has qualified for the following events based on the UCI Nations Rankings

Road

Mountain biking

BMX
Men

Fencing

Men

Women

Gymnastics

Artistic
Men
Individual

Women
Individual

Judo

Karate

Women

Shooting 

Men

Women

Mixed

Synchronised swimming

Slovakia has qualified for the following events

Table Tennis

Slovakia has qualified the following quota places:

Men

Women

Taekwondo

Triathlon

Swimming 

Men

Women

Volleyball
Slovakia has qualified for the following events

Men's indoor

Group – Pool B

|}

|}

Quarter-finals

|}

Water Polo
See Water polo at the 2015 European Games

Men's tournament
Group D

Play-off

Women's tournament
Group B

Wrestling

Men's Greco-Roman

Men's freestyle

Women's freestyle

References

Nations at the 2015 European Games
European Games
2015